The 1912 Victorian Football Association season was the 36th season of the Australian rules football competition. The premiership was won for the second consecutive time by the Essendon (Association) Football Club, after it defeated  in the Grand Final by 21 points on 28 September. It was the club's second and last VFA premiership.

Association membership 
After several years of unsuccessful on-field performances by both clubs, the Association was keen to see an amalgamation between the Preston and Northcote clubs; amalgamations between the two clubs, which represented neighbouring northern suburbs of Melbourne, had been mooted on several occasions since 1908, even before Northcote had joined the Association. For the first few years of their amalgamation, the club was formally known as the Northcote and Preston Football Club; but, it played its games in Northcote, retained Northcote's colours, and its team in the VFA was known as Northcote. The merged entity is considered a continuation of the Northcote Football Club.

At the same time, the Association had been keen for many years to field a team in the inner city, an area historically dominated by League clubs. This vision was finally realised in 1912, with the establishment of the Melbourne City Football Club, which played its games at the East Melbourne Cricket Ground.

With these two changes, the size of the Association remained constant at ten teams.

Rule changes
The Association reduced the number of players on the field seventeen-a-side to sixteen-a-side in 1912. The change came only four years after reducing the numbers from eighteen to seventeen in 1908.

Premiership 
The home-and-home season was played over eighteen rounds, with each club playing the others twice; then, the top four clubs contested a finals series under the amended Argus system to determine the premiers for the season.

Ladder

Finals

Notable events

Interstate matches 
A representative Association team toured Broken Hill in June and July, playing two matches against a Barrier Ranges Football Association representative team. Jack McKenzie (Brunswick) was captain of the Association team.

Other notable events 

 Dave McNamara (Essendon) set two new Association goalkicking records during the season. On 20 July, he kicked eighteen goals against Melbourne City, setting a new record for most goals in a game. Then he set a new record for most goals in a season, kicking 107 goals in all matches (including finals) to break his own record of 81 goals from 1911. So dominant was McNamara that he kicked more goals than the next best two players combined.
A replay was scheduled for two weeks later (the week after the other scheduled semi-final). The replay was also drawn, so another replay was held the following week.
 The premiership trophy, which had first been presented in 1910, was awarded permanently to the Essendon (A.) Football Club. The trophy was to be awarded to the first team to win it either three times overall, or twice consecutively.

External links 
 Victorian Football Association/Victorian Football League history (1877–2008)
 List of VFA premiers

References 

Victorian Football League seasons
VFL